Sankt Lorenz is a municipality in the district of Vöcklabruck in the Austrian state of Upper Austria.

Geography 
Sankt Lorenz lies in the Hausruckviertel. About 39 percent of the municipality is forest and 52 percent is farmland.

References 

Cities and towns in Vöcklabruck District